The men's 500 metres in speed skating at the 1976 Winter Olympics took place on 10 February, at the Eisschnellaufbahn.

Records
Prior to this competition, the existing world and Olympic records were as follows:

The following new Olympic record was set.

Results

References

Men's speed skating at the 1976 Winter Olympics